Gyeyangsan is a mountain located in Incheon, South Korea.
Its elevation makes it the second highest in Incheon, next to Manisan (Incheon) which is located in Gwanghwa Island.
From the top of the mountain, Gimpo Airport is visible, with a view of Seoul to the east, various islands such as Gwanghwa Island and Yeongjongdo in the west, Goyang in the north, and a whole view of Incheon to the south.
It is considered a symbol representing Incheon.

See also
Geography of Korea
List of mountains in Korea
List of mountains by elevation
Mountain portal
South Korea portal

References

Mountains of Incheon